Derrick Ansley (born December 11, 1981) is an American football coach and former player who is the defensive coordinator for the Los Angeles Chargers of the National Football League (NFL). He was previously the defensive coordinator at Tennessee. He played safety at Troy from 2001-2004 before starting his coaching career at Huntingdon, a Division-III school in 2005.

Playing career

Ansley played high school football at Tallassee High School, where he was an All-State honorable mention in 1998 and an All-State recipient in 1999. He played college football at Troy, where he started 40 consecutive games and had 19 interceptions in his career. He is tied for second-most interceptions in Troy history. Ansley is a member of Phi Beta Sigma fraternity.

Coaching career

Huntingdon
Ansley started his coaching career in 2005, where he was the defensive backs coach at Huntingdon.

Alabama
In 2010, he made the jump to Alabama as an on-field defensive graduate assistant. He spent one year as the defensive backs coach at Tennessee before leaving for the same position at Kentucky. His secondary improved every year he was there, going from 64th in pass defense in 2013, 44th in 2014, and 32nd in 2015. They also went from 85th in passing touchdowns allowed to 28th in 2015. He was hired by Alabama to serve the same role in 2016. While he was there, he coached Chuck Bednarik Award and Thorpe Award winner Minkah Fitzpatrick and All-American Marlon Humphrey.

Oakland Raiders
In 2018, he was hired by the Oakland Raiders to be their defensive backs coach, becoming the highest-paid defensive backs coach in the NFL. His unit improved from five interceptions in 2017 to 14 in 2018.

Tennessee
The following year, he was hired as the defensive coordinator at Tennessee. His defense improved from 77th in total defense to 23rd. He was not retained after the 2020 season due to the pay for play scandal.

Los Angeles Chargers
In 2021 he became the defensive backs coach for the Los Angeles Chargers.

On February 20, 2023, Ansley was promoted from defensive backs coach to defensive coordinator.

References

External links
 Tennessee Volunteers bio

1981 births
Living people
People from Tallassee, Alabama
American football defensive backs
Players of American football from Alabama
Troy Trojans football players
Coaches of American football from Alabama
Huntingdon Hawks football coaches
Alabama Crimson Tide football coaches
Tennessee Volunteers football coaches
Kentucky Wildcats football coaches
Oakland Raiders coaches
Los Angeles Chargers coaches
National Football League defensive coordinators